PANDA Basketball Academy is a youth basketball academy located in the town of Štip in North Macedonia. It opened in May 2008 and started practices in "Toso Arsov HS" gym. After a couple of months, practices ware also held at the "Dimitar Miraschiev HS" gym. PANDA Basketball Academy has teams in three categories (youngsters under 17, 15 and 13 years of age) as well as a mini-basket league team. Its founder and president is Tane Spasev, who is also the head coach of the teams. The teams compete in the Macedonian Basketball Federation.

Basketball in North Macedonia